The 1883 United States Senate election in Massachusetts was held in January 1883. Incumbent Republican Senator George Frisbie Hoar was re-elected to a second term in office despite a serious challenge from Democrats and members of his own party.

At the time, Massachusetts elected United States Senators by a resolution of the Massachusetts General Court.

Background

State legislature

At the time, the Massachusetts legislature was controlled by the Republican Party, as it had been since that party's founding. However, 1883 was the high point of the Massachusetts Democratic Party in the latter half of the 19th century. The upcoming Senate election was a dominant issue in the 1882 legislature elections.

The Senate was composed of 22 Republicans and 18 Democrats, and the House had 151 Republicans, 84 Democrats, and 5 independents. Unless the Republicans could emerge unanimously in favor of one candidate, it was possible for the Democratic Party to choose the winner from among the Republican candidates.

Anti-Hoar sentiment
Incumbent George F. Hoar, who was elected in 1877 after a protracted four-day struggle, faced strong opposition from within the Republican Party. The anti-Hoar faction cited his icy and aloof demeanor, which had allegedly cost him any chance at influence in the Senate.

Harvard President Charles William Eliot was among those who called for Hoar's defeat.

Newly elected Democratic Governor Benjamin F. Butler, a former Republican, was also a bitter rival of Hoar, decreasing the chances that he could rely on Democratic votes. The Democratic party, now at its apex, also may have looked to defeat Hoar to weaken the unity of the Republicans in the long term. However, Governor Butler's inaugural address may have inflamed partisan tensions, leading many Republicans to return to Hoar's side.

Edmunds speech
Before the election, Hoar made a speech in which he excoriated his Republican Senate colleague George F. Edmunds for missing a minor vote; Edmunds had been at the deathbed of his teenage daughter and just returned from her funeral. Edmunds rose in response and choking back tears said, "The Senator knows I was not present at the session." Hoar attempted to apologize, but his speech was widely criticized in the Democratic press.

Candidates

Declared
William W. Crapo, U.S. Representative from New Bedford
George F. Hoar, incumbent Senator
John Davis Long, outgoing Governor of Massachusetts

The chief names offered by anti-Hoar faction were William W. Crapo and outgoing Governor John Davis Long, a candidate more friendly to the Butler Democrats and the younger "progressive" element in the Republican Party, including Henry Cabot Lodge and Oliver Ames. Any candidate faced the difficult task of uniting the disparate elements of the anti-Hoar faction, which included Democrats, Butler Republicans, and anti-reform Stalwarts.

Potential
The following candidates were mentioned as potential candidates or received votes, but did not openly declare their willingness or desire to be elected.

Charles Francis Adams, Jr., author, business magnate, and reformer
Theodore Lyman, U.S. Representative-elect from Brookline

Declined
Benjamin F. Butler, Governor of Massachusetts

Election

Republican conference (January 10)
There was some effort made by Long supporters to call for a binding caucus of the Republican legislators, but this effort was defeated at an informal conference. Speeches at the conference expressed favor for Senator Hoar.

January 16
On the first day, balloting in the Senate dominated.

On the fifth ballot, Democrats abandoned Bowerman in favor of Long, giving him victory in the Senate.

In the House, a single ballot was taken, showing Hoar with a lead but 11 votes short of a majority.

January 17
On the second day, the two houses met in a joint convention. No candidates achieved a majority, but Hoar and Long each gained.

After the second ballot, a motion for a third ballot was defeated by the Hoar faction 128–119. The Long supporters claimed that a third ballot would have given their man the victory.

January 18

References

1883
Massachusetts
United States Senate